Raphael Aloysius "R. A."  Lafferty (November 7, 1914March 18, 2002) was an American science fiction and fantasy writer known for his original use of language, metaphor, and narrative structure, Lafferty also wrote a set of four autobiographical novels, a history book, and several novels of historical fiction.

Biography

Lafferty was born on November 7, 1914, in Neola, Iowa to devoutly Catholic parents, Hugh David Lafferty, a broker dealing in oil leases and royalties, and Julia Mary ( Burke), a teacher. He was born the youngest of five siblings. His first name, Raphael, derived from the day on which he was expected to be born (the Feast of St. Raphael). When he was 4, his family moved to Perry, Oklahoma. 

He graduated from Cascia Hall, and came of age in the early years of the Great Depression. He later attended night school at the University of Tulsa for two years starting in 1933, mostly studying Math and German, but left before graduating. He then began to work for Clark Electric Co. in Tulsa and, during this period (1939–42), he attended the International Correspondence School.

Lafferty lived most of his life in Tulsa with his sister, Anna Lafferty. He enlisted in the U.S. Army in 1942. After training in Texas, North Carolina, Florida, and California, he was sent to the South Pacific Area, serving in Australia, New Guinea, Morotai, and the Philippines. When he left the Army in 1946, he had become a 1st Sergeant serving as a staff sergeant and had received an Asiatic-Pacific Campaign Medal. He never married.

Lafferty did not begin writing until the 1950s, but he wrote thirty-two novels and more than two hundred short stories, most of them at least nominally science fiction. His first published story was "The Wagons" in the New Mexico Quarterly Review in 1959. His first published science fiction story was "Day of the Glacier", in The Original Science Fiction Stories in 1960, and his first published novel was Past Master in 1968.

Until 1971, Lafferty worked as an electrical engineer. After that, he spent his time writing until around 1980, when his output declined due to a stroke. He stopped writing regularly in 1984. 

In 1994, he suffered an even more severe stroke. He died on March 18, 2002, aged 87 in a nursing home in Broken Arrow, Oklahoma. His collected papers, artifacts, and ephemera were donated to the University of Tulsa's McFarlin Library, Department of Special Collections and University Archives. Other manuscripts are housed in the University of Iowa's Library special collections department.

Lafferty's funeral took place at Christ the King Catholic Church in Tulsa, where he regularly attended daily Mass. He is buried at St. Rose Catholic Cemetery in Perry.

Selected works

Lafferty's quirky prose drew from traditional storytelling styles, largely from the Irish and Native American, and his shaggy-dog characters and tall tales are unique in science fiction. Little of Lafferty's writing is considered typical of the genre. His stories are closer to tall tales than traditional science fiction and are deeply influenced by his Catholic beliefs; Fourth Mansions, for example, draws on The Interior Mansions of Teresa of Avila.

His writings, both topically and stylistically, are not easy to categorize. Plot is frequently secondary to other elements of Lafferty's writing; while this style has resulted in a loyal cult following, it causes some readers to give up attempting to read his work. Not all of Lafferty's work was science fiction or fantasy; his novel Okla Hannali (1972), published by University of Oklahoma Press, tells the story of the Choctaw in Mississippi, and after the Trail of Tears, in Oklahoma, through an account of the larger-than-life character Hannali and his large family. This novel was thought of highly by the novelist Dee Brown, author of Bury My Heart at Wounded Knee (1970), who on the back cover of the edition published by the University of Oklahoma Press,  writes "The history of the Choctaw Indians has been told before and is still being told, but it has never been told in the way Lafferty tells it ... Hannali is a buffalo bull of a man who should become one of the enduring characters in the literature of the American Indian." He also wrote, "It is art applied to history so that the legend of the Choctaws, their great and small men, their splendid humor, and their tragedies are filled with life and breath."

Lafferty's work is represented by Virginia Kidd Literary Agency, which holds a cache of his unpublished manuscripts. This includes over a dozen novels, such as In The Akrokeraunian Mountains and Iron Tongue of Midnight, as well as about eighty short stories and a handful of essays.

Novels

Science fiction
 Past Master, (1968); Hugo Award nominee, 1969; Nebula Award nominee 1968
 The Reefs of Earth (1968)
 Space Chantey (1968); a retelling of the Odyssey in SF terms
 Fourth Mansions (1969); Nebula Award nominee, 1970
 The Devil is Dead (1971); Nebula Award nominee, 1972 [Second chronologically in The Devil is Dead trilogy]
 Arrive at Easterwine: The Autobiography of a Ktistec Machine (1971)
 Not to Mention Camels (1976)
 Archipelago (1979); [First chronologically in The Devil is Dead trilogy]
 Aurelia (1982); Philip K. Dick Award nominee, 1982
 Annals of Klepsis (1983)
 Serpent's Egg (1987)
 East of Laughter (1988)
 How Many Miles to Babylon? (1989)
 The Elliptical Grave (1989)
 Dotty (1990)
 More Than Melchisedech (1992); [Third chronologically in The Devil is Dead trilogy, consists of three novels]
 Tales of Chicago
 Tales of Midnight
 Argo
 Sindbad: The Thirteenth Voyage (1989)

Other

 The Flame is Green (1971); [First in the unfinished Coscuin Chronicles]
 Okla Hannali (1972)
 Half a Sky (1984) [Second in the unfinished Coscuin Chronicles]

Collections

 Nine Hundred Grandmothers (1970)
 Strange Doings (1972)
 Does Anyone Else Have Something Further to Add? (1974)
 Funnyfingers & Cabrito (1976)
 Apocalypses (1977)
 Golden Gate and Other Stories (1982)
 Through Elegant Eyes (1983)
 Ringing Changes (1984)
 The Early Lafferty (1988)
 The Back Door of History (1988)
 Strange Skies (1988); poems
 The Early Lafferty II (1990)
 Episodes of the Argo (1990)
 Lafferty in Orbit (1991); World Fantasy Award nominee, 1992
 Mischief Malicious (And Murder Most Strange) (1991)
 Iron Tears (1992); Philip K. Dick Award nominee, 1992
 The Man Who Made Models – The Collected Short Fiction Volume 1 (2014)
 The Man With the Aura – The Collected Short Fiction Volume 2 (2015)
 The Man Underneath – The Collected Short Fiction Volume 3 (2015)
 The Man With The Speckled Eyes – The Collected Short Fiction Volume 4 (2017)
 The Man Who Walked Through Cracks – The Collected Short Fiction Volume 5 (2018)
 The Best of R. A. Lafferty (2019)

Non-fiction

 The Fall of Rome (1971); reprinted in 1993 as Alaric: The Day the World Ended
 It's Down the Slippery Cellar Stairs (1984)
 True Believers (1989)
 Cranky Old Man from Tulsa (1990)

Short stories

 "Through Other Eyes" (Future Science Fiction, February 1960)
 "All the People" (Galaxy Science Fiction, April 1961)
 "The Weirdest World" (Galaxy, June 1961)
 "Aloys" (Galaxy, August 1961)
 "Rainbird" (Galaxy, December 1961)
 "Dream" (Galaxy, June 1962)
 "Sodom and Gomorrah, Texas" (Galaxy, December 1962)
 "What the Name of That Town?" (Galaxy, October 1964)
 "Slow Tuesday Night" (Galaxy, April 1965)
 "Among the Hairy Earthmen" (Galaxy, August 1966)
 "Land of the Great Horses" (Dangerous Visions, 1967)
 "Thus We Frustrate Charlemagne" (Galaxy, February 1967)
 "How They Gave It Back" (Galaxy, February 1968)
 "McGruder's Marvels" (Galaxy, July 1968)
 "Eurema's Dam" (New Dimensions II, 1972)
 "The World as Will and Wallpaper", the title a wordplay on The World as Will and Representation (Future City, 1973)

Awards and recognition
Lafferty received Hugo nominations for Past Master, "Continued on Next Rock", "Sky", and "Eurema's Dam", the last of which won the Best Short Story Hugo in 1973 (shared with Frederik Pohl and C.M. Kornbluth's "The Meeting").

He received Nebula Award nominations for "In Our Block", "Slow Tuesday Night", Past Master, Fourth Mansions, "Continued on Next Rock", "Entire And Perfect Chrysolite", and The Devil is Dead. He never received a Nebula award.

His collection Lafferty in Orbit was nominated for a World Fantasy Award, and in 1990, Lafferty received a World Fantasy Lifetime Achievement Award. His 1992 collection Iron Tears was also a finalist for the Philip K. Dick Award. In 2002, he received the Cordwainer Smith Foundation's Rediscovery award.

The Oklahoma Department of Libraries granted him the Arrell Gibson Lifetime Achievement Award in 1995.

Fourth Mansions was also named by David Pringle as one of his selections for Modern Fantasy: The Hundred Best Novels.

Writing style
"[Once a] French publisher nervously asked whether Lafferty minded being compared to G. K. Chesterton (another Catholic author), and there was a terrifying silence that went on and on. Was the great man hideously offended? Eventually, very slowly, he said: 'You're on the right track, kid,' and wandered away."

In his 2006 short story collection Fragile Things, Neil Gaiman includes a short story called "Sunbird" written in the style of Lafferty. In the introduction, he says this about Lafferty:There was a writer from Tulsa, Oklahoma (he died in 2002), who was, for a little while in the late 1960s and early 1970s, the best short story writer in the world. His name was R. A. Lafferty, and his stories were unclassifiable and odd and inimitable -- you knew you were reading a Lafferty story within a sentence. When I was young I wrote to him, and he wrote back."Sunbird" was my attempt to write a Lafferty story, and it taught me a number of things, mostly how much harder they are than they look....

Gaiman and Lafferty had corresponded for several years during Gaiman's adolescence; he remembered Lafferty's letters as "filled with typical cock-eyed Lafferty humour and observations, wise and funny and sober all at once."

Archives
In March 2011, it was announced in Locus that the copyrights to 29 Lafferty novels and 225 short stories were up for sale. The literary estate was soon thereafter purchased by the magazine's nonprofit foundation, under the auspices of board member Neil Gaiman.

Further reading

References

External links

Digital editions
 
 
 
 
 

Fan pages
 R. A. Lafferty Devotional Page
 Feast of Laughter, a semi-annual fanzine dedicated to R. A. Lafferty

Physical collections
 R. A. Lafferty papers, 1959–1997, Department of Special Collections and University Archives, McFarlin Library, The University of Tulsa
 University of Iowa's page on their special collection of his papers

Profiles
 "And They Took the Sky Off at Night" – an appreciation of Lafferty by editor Brian Cholfin
 Article on Lafferty at Everything2
 "A Few Words About R. A. Lafferty"
 "Despair and the Duck Lady", Profile of Lafferty by Michael Swanwick
"R.A. Lafferty: An Attempt at an Appreciation"

Other links
 
 RALafferty.org, index to reviews and tributes
 Collection of obituaries
 "R. A. Lafferty: Winner of the 2002 Cordwainer Smith Foundation "Rediscovery" Award

1914 births
2002 deaths
20th-century American novelists
21st-century American novelists
American fantasy writers
American male novelists
American science fiction writers
Hugo Award-winning writers
People from Broken Arrow, Oklahoma
Novelists from Iowa
Novelists from Oklahoma
Roman Catholic writers
United States Army soldiers
World Fantasy Award-winning writers
United States Army personnel of World War II
American male short story writers
20th-century American short story writers
21st-century American short story writers
20th-century American male writers
21st-century American male writers
Catholics from Oklahoma